Yrjö, a masculine Finnish given name that is the equivalent of George, may refer to:
 Yrjö von Grönhagen, (1911–2003), Finnish anthropologist
 Yrjö Jylhä, (1903–1956), Finnish poet
 Yrjö Kilpinen (1892–1959), Finnish composer
 Yrjö Kokko (1903–1977), Finnish author
 Yrjö Lindegren (1900–1952), Finnish architect
 Yrjö Mäkelin (1875–1923), shoemaker
 Yrjö Nikkanen (1914–1985), Finnish athlete
 Yrjö Sakari Yrjö-Koskinen (1830–1903), freiherr, senator, professor, historian, and politician
 Yrjö Sirola (1876–1936), Finnish writer and socialist politician
 Yrjö Sotamaa, Finnish architect
 Yrjö Väisälä (1891–1971), Finnish astronomer and physicist
 Yrjö Vartia, economist

See also

George (given name)

Finnish masculine given names